Jerome of Pavia also known as Gerolamo was Bishop of Pavia, from 778 until his death. He was canonized on 20 December 1888 by Pope Leo XIII (cultus confirmation). The feast is celebrated on 19 July.

References

787 deaths
Italian Roman Catholic saints
Canonizations by Pope Leo XIII
8th-century Italian bishops
Bishops of Pavia
Year of birth unknown